Transylvania is a historical region in present-day Romania.

Transylvania may also refer to:

Places
 Principality of Transylvania (1570–1711), realm of the Hungarian Crown, a semi-independent state, vassal of the Ottoman Empire
 Principality of Transylvania (1711–1867), realm of the Hungarian Crown ruled by Habsburg Imperial Governors, crownland of the Austrian Empire since 1804
 Transilvania Airport, an airport in Romania
 1537 Transylvania, an asteroid

United States
 Transylvania, Louisiana, a small town in the United States
 Transylvania County, North Carolina, United States
 Transylvania (colony), an American colony in present-day Kentucky in the 1770s

Education
 Transilvania University of Brașov, a public university in Brașov, Romania
 Transylvania University, a private university in Lexington, Kentucky, United States

Entertainment
 Transylvania 6-5000 (1963 film), an animated short film starring Bugs Bunny
 Transylvania 6-5000 (1985 film), a comedy/horror movie
 Transylvania (film), the title of a 2006 film directed by Tony Gatlif
 Transylvania (board game), a 1981 game from Mayfair
 Transylvania (series), a computer game series of the 1980s
 "Transylvania" (song), a song by Iron Maiden on their 1980 self-titled album Iron Maiden
 Transylvania (Nox Arcana album)
 Transylvania (Creature with the Atom Brain album)
 "Transylvania", a song by Tyler, the Creator from his album Goblin
"Transylvania", a song by Kim Petras from her EP Turn Off the Light, Vol. 1
Transylvania, a fictional galaxy from The Rocky Horror Picture Show

See also
 Transylvanian (disambiguation)
 Transylvanian Carpathians (disambiguation)
 Baby's Coming Back/Transylvania, a single by English band McFly, taken from their 2006 album Motion in the Ocean
 Transylvania 90210: Songs of Death, Dying, and the Dead, a 2005 album by Wednesday 13 and also the title track from the album
 Transylvania in fiction
 Transylvania Mounds, an archaeological site in Louisiana, USA
 Trans-Sylvania Mountain Bike Epic
 Transylmania